This is a list of members of Parliament in Wales, elected for the Fifty-First Parliament of the United Kingdom in the 1992 general election.

MPs 

 Donald Anderson
 Nick Ainger
 Alex Carlile
 Ann Clwyd
 Cynog Dafis
 Denzil Davies
 Ron Davies
 Jonathan Evans
 Roger Evans
 Paul Flynn
 Win Griffiths
 Peter Hain
 David Hanson
 Kim Howells
 Royston John Hughes
 Barry Jones
 Gwilym Jones
 Martyn David Jones
 Ieuan Wyn Jones
 Jon Owen Jones
 Neil Kinnock
 John Marek
 Elfyn Llwyd
 Alun Michael
 John Morris
 Rhodri Morgan
 Paul Murphy
 Ray Powell
 Keith Raffan
 Allan Rogers
 Rod Richards
 Wyn Roberts
 Ted Rowlands
 John Smith
 Llew Smith
 Walter Sweeney
 Don Touhig
 Gareth Wardell
 Dafydd Wigley
 Alan Williams
 Alan Wynne Williams

References

See also 

 Lists of MPs for constituencies in Wales

Lists of MPs for constituencies in Wales
Lists of UK MPs 1992–1997